The 1907 Campeonato Paulista, organized by the LPF (Liga Paulista de Football), was the 6th season of São Paulo's top association football league. Internacional won the title for the 1st time. No teams were relegated and the top scorer was Internacional's Leônidas with 8 goals.

System
The championship was disputed in a double-round robin system, with the team with the most points winning the title.

Championship

References

Campeonato Paulista seasons
Paulista